Bordj Omar Driss is a town and commune in In Amenas District, Illizi Province, Algeria. According to the 2008 census it has a population of 5,736, up from 3,547 in 1998, and an annual population growth rate of 5.0%. Its postal code is 33210 and its municipal code is 3304.

Geography

To the south of the town is an area of sand dunes, beyond which lies the mountain range Djebel Essaoui Mellene, an extension of the Tassili n'Ajjer range.

Climate

Bordj Omar Driss has a hot desert climate (Köppen climate classification BWh), with long and extremely hot summers with averages high temperatures well above 40 °C (104 °F) during June, July and August and brief and very warm winters with averages low temperatures below 4 °C (39.2 °F) in January, the coldest month of the year as well as very little precipitation throughout the entire year as the town averages only about 25 mm of rainfall.

Transportation

A road connects Bordj Omar Driss to the N3 national highway (to Hassi Messaoud to the north and In Amenas to the east) at the village of Hassi Bel Guebour. The town in served by Bordj Omar Driss Airport.

Education

4.5% of the population has a tertiary education, and another 11.1% has completed secondary education. The overall literacy rate is 73.0%, and is 81.9% among males and 62.7% among females.

Localities
The commune is composed of eight localities:
Centre de Bordj Omar Driss
Zaouia Sidi Moussa
Hassi Bel Guebour
Tit
Tinfouye
Dayen
Hassi Tamenkort
Rhoud Ennous

References

Neighbouring towns and cities

In Amenas District
Tuareg
Communes of Illizi Province